Jacob and Eliza Spake House is located at 2600 State Street in Dallas, Texas, United States.  The house was added to the National Register of Historic Places on November 21, 1985.

Photo gallery

See also

National Register of Historic Places listings in Dallas County, Texas
List of Dallas Landmarks

References

External links

Houses completed in 1890
Houses in Dallas
National Register of Historic Places in Dallas
Houses on the National Register of Historic Places in Texas